For a graph, a maximum cut is a cut whose size is at least the size of any other cut. Finding such a cut is known as the max-cut problem.

The problem can be stated simply as follows. Equivalently, one wants a bipartite subgraph of the graph with as many edges as possible.

The weighted max-cut problem allowing both positive and negative weights can be trivially transformed into a weighted minimum cut problem by flipping the sign in all weights.

Lower bounds
Edwards obtained the following two lower bound for Max-Cut on a graph  with  vertices and  edges (in (a)  is arbitrary, but in (b) it is connected): 
(a) 
(b)  
Bound (b) is often called the Edwards-Erdős bound as Erdős conjectured it. Edwards proved the Edwards-Erdős bound using probabilistic method; Crowston et al. proved the bound using linear algebra and analysis of pseudo-boolean functions.

The proof of Crowston et al. allows us to extend the Edwards-Erdős bound to the Balanced Subgraph Problem (BSP)   on signed graphs , i.e. graphs where each edge is assigned + or –.
Bound (a) was improved for special classes of graphs: triangle-free graphs, graphs of given maximum degree, -free graphs, etc., see e.g.

Poljak and Turzik extended the Edwards-Erdős bound to weighted Max-Cut: 
 
Recently, Gutin and Yeo obtained a number of lower bounds for weighted Max-Cut extending the Poljak-Turzik bound for arbitrary weighted graphs and bounds for special classes of weighted graphs.

Computational complexity
The following decision problem related to maximum cuts has been studied widely in theoretical computer science:

Given a graph G and an integer k, determine whether there is a cut of size at least k in G.

This problem is known to be NP-complete. It is easy to see that the problem is in NP: a yes answer is easy to prove by presenting a large enough cut. The NP-completeness of the problem can be shown, for example, by a reduction from maximum 2-satisfiability (a restriction of the maximum satisfiability problem). The weighted version of the decision problem was one of Karp's 21 NP-complete problems; Karp showed the NP-completeness by a reduction from the partition problem.

The canonical optimization variant of the above decision problem is usually known as the Maximum-Cut Problem or Max-Cut and is defined as:

Given a graph G, find a maximum cut.

The optimization variant is known to be NP-Hard.
The opposite problem, that of finding a minimum cut is known to be efficiently solvable via the Ford–Fulkerson algorithm.

Algorithms

Polynomial-time algorithms
As the Max-Cut Problem is NP-hard, no polynomial-time algorithms for Max-Cut in general graphs are known.

Planar graphs 
However, in planar graphs, the Maximum-Cut Problem is dual to the route inspection problem (the problem of finding a shortest tour that visits each edge of a graph at least once), in the sense that the edges that do not belong to a maximum cut-set of a graph G are the duals of the edges that are doubled in an optimal inspection tour of the dual graph of G. The optimal inspection tour forms a self-intersecting curve that separates the plane into two subsets, the subset of points for which the winding number of the curve is even and the subset for which the winding number is odd; these two subsets form a cut that includes all of the edges whose duals appear an odd number of times in the tour. The route inspection problem may be solved in polynomial time, and this duality allows the maximum cut problem to also be solved in polynomial time for planar graphs. The Maximum-Bisection problem is known however to be NP-hard.

Approximation algorithms
The Max-Cut Problem is APX-hard, meaning that there is no polynomial-time approximation scheme (PTAS), arbitrarily close to the optimal solution, for it, unless P = NP. Thus, every known polynomial-time approximation algorithm achieves an approximation ratio strictly less than one.

There is a simple randomized 0.5-approximation algorithm: for each vertex flip a coin to decide to which half of the partition to assign it. In expectation, half of the edges are cut edges. This algorithm can be derandomized with the method of conditional probabilities; therefore there is a simple deterministic polynomial-time 0.5-approximation algorithm as well. One such algorithm starts with an arbitrary partition of the vertices of the given graph  and repeatedly moves one vertex at a time from one side of the partition to the other, improving the solution at each step, until no more improvements of this type can be made. The number of iterations is at most  because the algorithm improves the cut by at least one edge at each step. When the algorithm terminates, at least half of the edges incident to every vertex belong to the cut, for otherwise moving the vertex would improve the cut. Therefore, the cut includes at least  edges.

The polynomial-time approximation algorithm for Max-Cut with the best known approximation ratio is a method by Goemans and Williamson using semidefinite programming and randomized rounding that achieves an approximation ratio  where

If the unique games conjecture is true, this is the best possible approximation ratio for maximum cut.

In  there is an extended analysis of 10 heuristics for this problem, including open-source implementation.

Parameterized algorithms and kernelization 

While it is trivial to prove that the problem of finding a cut of size at least (the parameter) k is fixed-parameter tractable (FPT), it is much harder to show fixed-parameter tractability for the problem of deciding whether a graph G has a cut of size at least the Edwards-Erdős lower bound (see Lower bounds above) plus (the parameter)k. Crowston et al. proved that the problem can be solved in time  and admits a  kernel of size .

Applications

Theoretical physics 

In statistical physics and disordered systems, the Max Cut problem is equivalent to minimizing the Hamiltonian of a spin glass model, most simply the Ising model. For the Ising model on a graph G and only nearest-neighbor interactions, the Hamiltonian is

Here each vertex i of the graph is a spin site that can take a spin value  A spin configuration partitions  into two sets, those with spin up  and those with spin down  We denote with  the set of edges that connect the two sets. We can then rewrite the Hamiltonian as

Minimizing this energy is equivalent to the min-cut problem or by setting the graph weights as  the max-cut problem.

Circuit design 
The max cut problem has applications in VLSI design.

See also
Minimum cut
Minimum k-cut
Odd cycle transversal, equivalent to asking for the largest bipartite induced subgraph
Unfriendly partition, a related concept for infinite graphs

Notes

References
.
.
Maximum cut (optimisation version) is the problem ND14 in Appendix B (page 399).
.
.
.
.
.
.
.
.
.
Maximum cut (decision version) is the problem ND16 in Appendix A2.2.
Maximum bipartite subgraph (decision version) is the problem GT25 in Appendix A1.2.
.
.
.
.
.
.
.
.
.
.
.
.
.
.
.
.
.

External links
 Pierluigi Crescenzi, Viggo Kann, Magnús Halldórsson, Marek Karpinski, Gerhard Woeginger (2000), "Maximum Cut", in "A compendium of NP optimization problems".
 Andrea Casini, Nicola Rebagliati (2012), "A Python library for solving Max Cut"

Graph theory objects
Combinatorial optimization
NP-complete problems
Computational problems in graph theory